The 1999 Peterborough City Council election took place on 6 May 1999 to elect members of Peterborough City Council in England. This was on the same day as other local elections.

Election result

References

1999
1990s in Cambridgeshire
Peterborough